Eugen Kürschner (1890-1939) was a Hungarian film producer.

Selected filmography
 Der Graf von Essex (1922)
 Prinz Louis Ferdinand (1927)
 Orient Express (1927)
 Boycott (1930)
 The Countess of Monte Cristo (1932)
 Der Liebesphotograph (1933)
 Today Is the Day (1933)

External links

1890 births
1939 deaths
Hungarian film producers
Film people from Budapest